Lukas Scepanik (born 11 April 1994) is a German professional footballer who plays as a midfielder for Regionalliga West club 1. FC Kaan-Marienborn.

Career
Scepanik moved to MSV Duisburg on 1 June 2019. He made his professional debut for MSV Duisburg in the 3. Liga on 18 October 2019, in the home match against 1. FC Kaiserslautern. On 26 May 2021, it was announced that he would leave Duisburg at the end of the 2020–21 season. He moved to Türkgücü München on 7 October 2021.

On 20 July 2022, Scepanik signed with Regionalliga West club 1. FC Kaan-Marienborn, after his former club Türkgücü München had been relegated after filing for insolvency.

Career statistics

References

External links

1994 births
Living people
Footballers from Cologne
German footballers
Association football midfielders
1. FC Köln II players
Stuttgarter Kickers II players
Stuttgarter Kickers players
Rot-Weiss Essen players
MSV Duisburg players
Türkgücü München players
1. FC Kaan-Marienborn players
3. Liga players
Regionalliga players